Lasiopetalum glabratum is a species of flowering plant in the family Malvaceae and is endemic to the south-west of Western Australia. It is an erect shrub with densely hairy young stems, egg-shaped leaves and pale mauve-pink reddish-purple flowers.

Description
Flowering usually occurs from August to December.

Taxonomy
Lasiopetalum glabratum was first formally described in 1974 by Susan Paust in the journal Nuytsia from specimens she collected near Mount Cooke in 1971.  The specific epithet (glabratum) means "without hair".

Distribution and habitat
This lasiopetalum grows in forest or woodland, in areas east of Perth in the Avon Wheatbelt, Geraldton Sandplains, Jarrah Forest and Swan Coastal Plain biogeographic regions of south-western Western Australia.

Conservation status
Lasiopetalum glabratum is listed as "not threatened" by the Government of Western Australia Department of Biodiversity, Conservation and Attractions.

References

glabratum
Malvales of Australia
Rosids of Western Australia
Plants described in 1974